Jürgen Pezzi is an Italian luger who competed during the 1990s. A natural track luger, he won the silver medal in the men's doubles event at the 1994 FIL World Luge Natural Track Championships in Gsies, Italy.

Pezzi also won two medals in the men's doubles event at the FIL European Luge Natural Track Championships with a silver in 1993 and a bronze in 1995.

References
Natural track European Championships results 1970-2006.
Natural track World Championships results: 1979-2007

Italian lugers
Italian male lugers
Living people
Year of birth missing (living people)
Sportspeople from Südtirol